The Eastridge Transit Center is a Santa Clara Valley Transportation Authority (VTA) bus terminal located at the Eastridge Mall in the Evergreen District of San Jose, California. The station is located alongside Capitol Expressway near Tully Road.


Bus routes
The following bus routes operate from Eastridge:
VTA Bus:
22 - Eastridge to the Palo Alto Transit Center via Downtown San Jose
26 - Eastridge to West Valley College
31 - Eastridge to Evergreen Valley College
39 - Eastridge to The Villages
70 - VTA light rail Capitol station to the Milpitas Transit Center via Capitol Expressway and Jackson Ave.
71 - Eastridge to the Milpitas Transit Center via White Rd. and Piedmont Rd.
77 - Eastridge to the Milpitas Transit Center via King Rd.
Express 103 - Eastridge to Stanford Research Park
Rapid 522 - Eastridge to the Palo Alto Transit Center via Downtown San Jose
Flixbus (intercity bus service)

Light rail extension 
The VTA light rail Orange Line is planned to be extended to Eastridge from its current terminus at the Alum Rock Transit Center, as part of the Eastridge to BART Regional Connector Project. This new extension would offer rail connection to the Milpitas Transit Center and the Mountain View Transit Center, providing access to Bay Area Rapid Transit (BART) and Caltrain. After utility relocation for the project is complete in September 2022, construction would commence in Winter 2023 and revenue service is expected to begin in 2027.

References

External links
Eastridge Transit Center — Valley Transportation Authority

Santa Clara Valley Transportation Authority bus stations
Transportation in San Jose, California
Buildings and structures in San Jose, California
Railway stations scheduled to open in 2027